Gentle Leader is the fourth album by the Canadian/American rock band Peach Kelli Pop, released in 2018 by Mint Records. It is the first Peach Kelli Pop record not solely written by Allie Hanlon.

The first track, "Hello Kitty Knife" was released in early April 2018. "Black Cat 13" was released in late April.

On June 1, 2018, Gentle Leader was "Album of the Day" on Bandcamp.

Track listing

Production
Recorded by Andrew Schubert at Golden Beat Studios 
Jesse Gander   – mastering 
Roland Cosio  – mixing  
Roland Cosio and Allie Hanlon  – producers

References

External links
Gentle Leader on Bandcamp

2018 albums